The Dreamer is a 1970 Israeli drama film directed by Dan Wolman. It was entered into the 1970 Cannes Film Festival.

Cast
 Tuvia Tavi as Eli
  as Girl
 Berta Litwina as Old Woman Rachel
 Shlomo Bar-Shavit as Manager of Home
 Dvora Kedar as Mother (as Devora Halter-Keidar)
  as Father
 Yisrael Segal as Waiter
  as Mushkin (as Nathan W. Volfovitz)
 Bila Rabinovitz as Litvinna

References

External links

1970 films
1970s Hebrew-language films
1970 drama films
Films directed by Dan Wolman
Golan-Globus films
Israeli drama films